The Oxfordshire Rugby Football Union is the governing body for the sport of rugby union in the county of Oxfordshire in England. The union is the constituent body of the Rugby Football Union (RFU) for Oxfordshire, and administers and organises rugby union clubs and competitions in the county. It also administers the Oxfordshire county rugby representative teams.

History 

The Oxfordshire RFU was first formed during the 1931–32 season with L.C. Gower being the first ever president.  There is little of note of the county's early history although a county cup competition was introduced for local clubs during the 1970s. In 2003 the men's senior team reached the final of the County Championship Shield (now Plate) losing 8–27 to Northumberland at Twickenham Stadium. In 2006 they made Twickenham for second time, this time in the final of the County Championship Plate (now Shield), losing 17–21 to Notts, Lincs & Derbyshire. In 2017 the county made it third time lucky in the 2017 County Championship Shield final, edging Sussex by virtue of tries scored after the game finished 29–29.

Oxfordshire senior men's county side

The Oxfordshire seniors men's team currently play in Division 3 of the County Championship.

Honours:
County Championship Division 3 winners: 2017, 2022

Affiliated clubs
There are currently 18 clubs affiliated with the Oxfordshire RFU, with teams at both senior and junior level.

Abingdon
Alchester
Banbury
Bicester
Chinnor
Chipping Norton
Didcot 
Faringdon
Gosford All Blacks
Grove
Harwell
Henley Hawks
Littlemore
Oxford
Oxford Harlequins
Wallingford
Wheatley
Witney

County club competitions 

The Oxfordshire RFU currently helps run the following club competitions:

Leagues

Since 2000–01 the league system in this region is combined between three rugby football unions – Buckinghamshire, Berkshire and Oxfordshire.  Prior to this Buckinghamshire and Oxfordshire had run a combined league, while Berkshire had been grouped with Dorset & Wilts.  Currently there are several divisions for first teams in the region including:

Berks/Bucks & Oxon Premier – league ranked at tier 8 of the English rugby union system

As well as leagues for second and third teams (currently no promotion into the English league system):

Berks/Bucks & Oxon 1 Level 8  
Berks/Bucks & Oxon 2S & 2N Level 9  
Berks/Bucks & Oxon 3S & 3N Level 10

Cups
Oxfordshire RFU County Cup – introduced in 1970, for local clubs at tiers 6–7 of the English rugby union system as well as 2nd teams for local clubs in higher divisions (tiers 3–4)
Oxfordshire RFU County Shield

See also
South West Division
English rugby union system

References

External links 
Oxfordshire RFU website

Rugby union governing bodies in England
1931 establishments in England
Rugby union in Oxfordshire